The Rutherford Medal (instituted in 1991 and known as the New Zealand Science and Technology Gold Medal until 2000) is the most prestigious award offered by the Royal Society of New Zealand, consisting of a medal and prize of $100,000. It is awarded at the request of the New Zealand Government to recognize exceptional contributions to the advancement and promotion of public awareness, knowledge and understanding in addition to eminent research or technological practice by a person or group in any field of science, mathematics, social science, or technology. It is funded by the New Zealand government and awarded annually.

The medal is named after Ernest Rutherford, the New Zealand experimental physicist and Nobel Laureate, who pioneered the orbital theory of the atom.

Recipients
Source: Royal Society of New Zealand
New Zealand Science and Technology Gold Medal
1991: Vaughan Jones, mathematician, Fields medalist
1992: Department of Scientific and Industrial Research Group Award
1993: Roy Kerr, mathematician
1994: Ian Axford, physicist
1995: Bill Denny, oncologist, and Auckland Cancer Research Laboratory
1996: No award
1997: Thomas William Walker, soil scientist
1998: Bill Robinson, seismologist
1999: David Vere-Jones, statistician
Rutherford Medal
2000: Alan MacDiarmid, chemist, Nobel Prize winner
2001: Peter Gluckman, biologist
2002: Jeff Tallon, physicist
2003: George Petersen, biochemist
2004: David Penny, theoretical biologist
2005: Paul Callaghan, physicist
2006: Ted Baker, structural biologist
2007: Richard Faull, neuroscientist
2008: David Parry, structural biophysicist
2009: Peter Hunter, computational bioengineer
2010: Warren Tate, biochemist
2011: Christine Winterbourn, biochemist
2012: Margaret Brimble, chemist
2013: Anne Salmond, social scientist
2014: Peter Schwerdtfeger, theoretical chemist and physicist
2015: Ian Reid, osteologist
2016: Michael Corballis, psychologist
2017: Colin Wilson, volcanologist
2018: Rod Downey, mathematician
2019: Jane Harding, neonatologist
2020: Brian Boyd, professor of literature
2021: Philippa Howden-Chapman, healthy housing researcher and her team
2022: The Dunedin Study, led by Richie Poulton, with team members Murray Thomson, Terrie Moffitt and Avshalom Caspi.

See also
 Marsden Medal
 List of general science and technology awards 
 List of awards named after people

References

External links
Rutherford Medal, Royal Society of New Zealand
Medals, Rutherford.org.nz by John Campbell

Science and technology in New Zealand
New Zealand science and technology awards
Awards established in 1991
1991 establishments in New Zealand
Royal Society of New Zealand